Paul Mazzio (born 1959/60) is an American jazz trumpeter, based in Portland, Oregon. A graduate of the University of North Texas and the University of Southern California, while a student in Texas he won 1st place in the 1982 Jazz Improvization Contest. Mazzio has performed with many artists including the Chuck Israels Orchestra, Tony Bennett, Larry Carlton, the Moody Blues etc. He traveled extensively with the Woody Herman Orchestra in the 1990s. His playing has a warm tone.

References

External links
Official site

American jazz trumpeters
American male trumpeters
1960s births
Living people
Musicians from Portland, Oregon
University of North Texas College of Music alumni
University of Southern California alumni
Year of birth uncertain
American male jazz musicians